Petroliana is a category of collectibles that is related to gas stations or the petroleum industry. Petroliana memorabilia include items such as old gas pumps, fuel advertisements, enamel or tin signs, oil cans and tins, and road maps.

See also
Automobilia
List of petroleum and gas museums

References

Further reading

External links
 Museo Fisogni
 British petroliana site
 Primarily Petroliana
 GasPumps.info
 OilSign.com

Collecting
Memorabilia
Petroleum industry